Seth Roland (born 1957) is the head coach of the Fairleigh Dickinson men's soccer team, a position he has held since 1997. As a player, he won a silver medal with Team USA at the 1981 Maccabiah Games in Israel. As a coach of Team USA, he won a bronze medal at the 1993 Maccabiah Games.  His FDU team has won eight NEC championships and made it to the Sweet 16 and Elite Eight.  As of 2022, he was the winningest coach in FDU men's soccer history, the winningest coach in Northeast Conference history, and the ninth active-winningest-coach in NCAA Division I. He was named 2000 Northeast Conference Men's Soccer Coach of the Year.

Early and personal life
Roland is a native of Teaneck, New Jersey. His parents were Doris Leah (nee Rubin) Roland, a psychologist, and Leonard Roland, a chemical engineer. In 2000 his wife Marjorie died from brain cancer. He and his wife Julia have two daughters, Hannah and Laura, and a son, Daniel.

Playing career

College
Roland attended the University of Pennsylvania, where he played soccer and was a starting midfielder for the Quakers for three years, and was named All-Ivy League. At Penn he earned a Bachelor of Arts in History, and a Master of Science in Education.

Maccabiah Games
He represented the United States in four Maccabiah Games tournaments in Israel, winning a silver medal in the 1981 Maccabiah Games, as he was the leading scorer on the team—he also represented Team USA at the  1977 Maccabiah Games, 1985 Maccabiah Games, and 1989 Maccabiah Games.

Coaching career

Maccabiah Games
Roland managed the Team USA squad for the 1993 Maccabiah Games (winning the bronze medal), 1997 Maccabiah Games, 2009 Maccabiah Games, and 2022 Maccabiah Games.

College
He was the Assistant Men’s Soccer Coach at Columbia University from 1980–81, and the Head Men’s Soccer Coach at  the College of Staten Island from 1981-82. Roland was then the Head Men’s Soccer Coach at Christopher Newport University from 1982–87, and the Head Men’s Soccer Coach at the University of Bridgeport (New England Collegiate Conference) from 1987-92. He was then the Assistant Men’s Soccer Coach at the College of William & Mary (Colonial Athletic Association) from 1992-97.

A resident of Tenafly, New Jersey, Roland has been the head coach of the Fairleigh Dickinson men's soccer team in the Northeast Conference since 1997. He was named 2000 Northeast Conference Men's Soccer Coach of the Year. As of 2022, he was the winningest coach in FDU men's soccer history (223-186-65, .538), the winningest coach in Northeast Conference history (115-60-37, .626), and the ninth active-winningest-coach in NCAA Division I.

References

External links
 

Living people
American soccer coaches
Christopher Newport Captains
College of Staten Island faculty
Columbia Lions men's soccer coaches
Competitors at the 1977 Maccabiah Games
Competitors at the 1981 Maccabiah Games
Competitors at the 1985 Maccabiah Games
Competitors at the 1989 Maccabiah Games
Jewish American sportspeople
Jewish footballers
American soccer players
Fairleigh Dickinson Knights men's soccer coaches
William & Mary Tribe men's soccer coaches
Maccabiah Games medalists in football
Maccabiah Games silver medalists for the United States
Penn Quakers men's soccer players
1957 births
Association football midfielders
Soccer players from New Jersey
People from Teaneck, New Jersey
People from Tenafly, New Jersey
Sportspeople from Bergen County, New Jersey
Bridgeport Purple Knights men's soccer coaches